Lauri Pedaja (born 4 April 1987 in Rakvere) is an Estonian actor and hairdresser. He debuted as an actor in 2007 film The Class directed by Ilmar Raag, where he had one of the lead roles.

In 2008, Pedaja participated as a celebrity contestant on the third season of Tantsud tähtedega, an Estonian version of Dancing with the Stars. His professional dancing partner was Kristina Tennokese.

Filmography
Films

Television

External links 

1987 births
Living people
Estonian male film actors
Estonian male television actors
Hairdressers
People from Rakvere
21st-century Estonian male actors
Tantsud tähtedega